Polar Science is a quarterly peer-reviewed scientific journal covering research related to the polar regions of the Earth and other planets. It is published by Elsevier on behalf of the National Institute of Polar Research (Japan). It covers a wide range of fields, including atmospheric science, oceanography, glaciology and environmental science. The editor-in-chief is Takashi Yamanouchi (National Institute of Polar Research and Sōkendai).

The journal is hybrid open access. By paying a fee, authors can choose to make their papers open access at the time of publication. All papers that are over 24 months old are freely available to the community via ScienceDirect.

Abstracting and indexing 
The journal is abstracted and indexed in the Science Citation Index Expanded, Scopus, EBSCOhost, GEOBASE, GeoRef, ProQuest and Referativnyi Zhurnal (VINITI Database RAS). According to the Journal Citation Reports, the journal has a 2020 impact factor of 1.927.

References

External links

Earth and atmospheric sciences journals
Environmental science journals
Glaciology journals
Oceanography journals
Elsevier academic journals
Quarterly journals
Hybrid open access journals
English-language journals
Publications established in 2007